Glušinja is a naselje (settlement) in the municipality of Žumberak, Zagreb County, Croatia.

In 1835, Glušinja had 7 houses and 83 inhabitants. 

Glušinja had 22 inhabitants according to the census in 2011.  

The Greek Catholic parish church of Saints Peter and Paul from the 17th century is located near Glušinja.

References

Populated places in Zagreb County